Giuseppe Gaspari (born September 6, 1932 in Ascoli Piceno) is a retired Italian professional football player.

1932 births
Living people
Italian footballers
Serie A players
U.S. Livorno 1915 players
Catania S.S.D. players
Juventus F.C. players
Modena F.C. players
Association football goalkeepers